Thomas Fleming Day (1861 – August 19, 1927) was a sailboat designer and sailboat racer. He was the founding editor of The Rudder, a monthly magazine about boats. He was the first to win the annual New York to Bermuda race. The T. F. Day Trophy is named for him.

Biography
He was born in Somerset, England in March 1861, emigrated with his parents to the United States when he was a young boy, and was brought up on Long Island Sound. In 1890, he founded The Rudder, "A monthly journal devoted to aquatic sport and trade," which he edited until April 1916. In 1911 he and Frederick B. Thurber and Theodore R. Goodwin sailed the Atlantic Ocean in Seabird (ship). In 1918 he designed the Islander that Harry Pidgeon built and sailed to become the second person to sail around the world.

He died on August 19, 1927 in Harlem, New York.

Day was inducted into the National Sailing Hall of Fame on November 9, 2019.

References

External links
 
 
 

1861 births
1927 deaths
American sailors